The Second Bill of Rights or Bill of Economic Rights was proposed by United States President Franklin D. Roosevelt during his State of the Union Address on Tuesday, January 11, 1944. In his address, Roosevelt suggested that the nation had come to recognise and should now implement, a second "bill of rights". Roosevelt argued that the "political rights" guaranteed by the Constitution and the Bill of Rights had "proved inadequate to assure us equality in the pursuit of happiness". His remedy was to declare an "economic bill of rights" to guarantee these specific rights:
 Employment (right to work)
 An adequate income for food, shelter, and recreation
 Farmers' rights to a fair income 
 Freedom from unfair competition and monopolies 
 Decent housing 
 Adequate medical care 
 Social security
 Education

These rights have come to be known as economic rights; although not to be enshrined within the constitution, the hope of advocating the policy was that it would be 'encoded and guaranteed by federal law'. Roosevelt stated that having such rights would guarantee American security and that the United States' place in the world depended upon how far the rights had been carried into practice. This safety has been described as a state of physical welfare, as well as "economic security, social security, and moral security" by American legal scholar Cass Sunstein. Roosevelt pursued a legislative agenda to enact his second bill of rights by lending Executive Branch personnel to key Senate committees. This tactic, effectively a blending of powers, produced mixed results and generated a backlash from Congress which resulted in passage of the Legislative Reorganization Act of 1946. This Act provided funding for Congress to establish its own staffing for committees.

Background 

In the runup to the Second World War, the United States had suffered through the Great Depression following the Wall Street Crash of 1929. Roosevelt's election at the end of 1932 was based on a commitment to reform the economy and society through a "New Deal" program. The first indication of a commitment to government guarantees of social and economic rights came in an address to the Commonwealth Club on September 23, 1932, during his campaign. The speech was written with Adolf A. Berle, a professor of corporate law at Columbia University. A key passage read: 

Throughout Roosevelt's presidency, he returned to the same theme continually over the course of the New Deal. Also in the Atlantic Charter, an international commitment was made as the Allies thought about how to "win the peace" following victory in the Second World War. The US' commitment to non-interventionism in World War II ending with the 1941 Lend-Lease act, and later Pearl Harbor attacks, resulted in the mobilisation of the war state. The generous terms of the act, in conjunction with the economic growth of the US were key in allowing the US to establish new global order with the help of Allied powers in the aftermath of war. This motivation to establish a new global order provided the infrastructure for the implementation of an international standard of human rights, seen with the Second Bill of Rights and the Universal Declaration of Human Rights. Akira Iriye's proposition that the US desired to transform the post war Pacific after their own image is representative of the wider desire to raise global standards to that of the US, feeding into ideals of American Exceptionalism. The effect of wider democratisation and social reform is divulged upon in Francis Fukuyama's The End of History and the Last Man.

Roosevelt's speech 
During Roosevelt's January 11, 1944, message to the Congress on the State of the Union, he said the following:

Found footage 

Roosevelt presented the January 11, 1944, State of the Union address to the public on radio as a fireside chat from the White House: Today I sent my Annual Message to the Congress, as required by the Constitution. It has been my custom to deliver these Annual Messages in person, and they have been broadcast to the Nation. I intended to follow this same custom this year. But like a great many other people, I have had the "flu", and although I am practically recovered, my doctor simply would not let me leave the White House to go up to the Capitol. Only a few of the newspapers of the United States can print the Message in full, and I am anxious that the American people be given an opportunity to hear what I have recommended to the Congress for this very fateful year in our history — and the reasons for those recommendations. Here is what I said ...

He asked that newsreel cameras film the last portion of the address, concerning the Second Bill of Rights. This footage was believed lost until it was uncovered in 2008 in South Carolina by Michael Moore while researching the film Capitalism: A Love Story. The footage shows Roosevelt's Second Bill of Rights address in its entirety as well as a shot of the eight rights printed on a sheet of paper.

See also 

 Bill of Rights
 Bill of Rights socialism
 Douglas v. California, 372 U.S. 353 (1963)
 Economic democracy
 Four Freedoms, enunciated in Roosevelt's 1941 State of the Union Address
 Full employment
 Goldberg v. Kelly, 397 U.S. 254 (1970)
 Progressive Utilization Theory
 Public education
 Public Service law of the United States
 Social Security
 Universal health care
 Vernon v Bethell

Footnotes

Citations

References 
 Adolph A. Berle, 'Property, Production and Revolution' (1965) 65 Columbia Law Review 1
 Cass R. Sunstein, The Second Bill of Rights: FDR's Unfinished Revolution--And Why We Need It More Than Ever (2004)

External links 
 FDR Second Bill of Rights Speech Footage - YouTube
 Audio recording of the speech on Youtube
 FDR's Unfinished "Second Bill of Rights" – and Why We Need it Now

1944 in politics
1944 in the United States
1944 speeches
Presidency of Franklin D. Roosevelt
State of the Union addresses
Speeches by Franklin D. Roosevelt
Human rights in the United States
78th United States Congress
Articles containing video clips